Ivanovsky is a rural locality (a settlement) in Nachalovsky Selsoviet, Privolzhsky District, Astrakhan Oblast, Russia. The population was 63 as of 2010. There are 10 streets.

Geography 
Ivanovsky is located 9 km east of Nachalovo (the district's administrative centre) by road. Bushma and Biryukovka are the nearest rural localities.

References 

Rural localities in Privolzhsky District, Astrakhan Oblast